Patrick Hume Kendall (8 March 1927 – 18 July 1968) was an English competitive swimmer.

Swimming career
Kendall represented Great Britain at the 1948 Summer Olympics in London.  Kendall competed in the round one preliminary heats of the men's 100-metre freestyle event, but he did not advance.  Two years later, he won a gold medal in the 3x110-yard medley relay as a member of the winning English team at the 1950 British Empire Games in Auckland, New Zealand. He won the 1947 and 1950 ASA National Championship 100 metres freestyle title.

See also
 List of Commonwealth Games medallists in swimming (men)

References

1927 births
1968 deaths
People from Rochford
English male freestyle swimmers
Olympic swimmers of Great Britain
Swimmers at the 1948 Summer Olympics
Swimmers at the 1950 British Empire Games
Commonwealth Games gold medallists for England
Commonwealth Games medallists in swimming
Medallists at the 1950 British Empire Games